Aetholix borneensis is a moth in the family Crambidae. It was described by George Hampson in 1912. It is found on Borneo.

References

Moths described in 1912
Spilomelinae
Moths of Borneo